This Reckless Age is a 1932 American pre-Code comedy film directed by Frank Tuttle and starring Charles "Buddy" Rogers and  produced and distributed by Paramount Pictures. The film is based on a Broadway play The Goose Hangs High by Lewis Beach.

One of over 700 Paramount films controlled by Universal Pictures, which in 1948 purchased most of the 1928-1948 Paramount library.

Cast
Charles "Buddy" Rogers as Bradley Ingals
Richard Bennett as Donald Ingals
Peggy Shannon as  Mary Burke
Charles Ruggles as Goliath Whitney
Frances Dee as Lois Ingals
Frances Starr as Eunice Ingals
Maude Eburne as Rhoda
Allen Vincent as Pig Van Dyke
Mary Carlisle as Cassandra Phelps
David Landau as Matthew Daggett
Reginald Barlow as Lester Bell
George C. Pearce as John Burke
Grady Sutton as Stepladder Schultz
Harry Templeton as Monk Turner
Berton Churchill as Banker
Leonard Carey as Braithwaite (uncredited)

References

External links

This Reckless Age at AllRovi

1932 films
American films based on plays
Films directed by Frank Tuttle
Paramount Pictures films
1932 comedy films
Films with screenplays by Joseph L. Mankiewicz
American comedy films
1930s English-language films
Films scored by John Leipold
1930s American films